Tommaso Emmanuele Nobile (born 3 November 1996) is an Italian footballer who plays as a goalkeeper for  club Foggia.

Club career
He made his Serie C debut for Lucchese on 25 September 2016 in a game against Arezzo.

On 13 August 2019, he joined Carpi on loan with an option to buy.

On 20 August 2020 he signed a 2-year contract with Sambenedettese.

On 18 August 2021, he moved to Virtus Francavilla.

On 8 July 2022, Nobile signed a two-year contract with Foggia.

References

External links
 

1996 births
Footballers from Naples
Living people
Italian footballers
Association football goalkeepers
S.S.D. Lucchese 1905 players
F.C. Pro Vercelli 1892 players
Alma Juventus Fano 1906 players
A.C. Carpi players
A.S. Sambenedettese players
Virtus Francavilla Calcio players
Calcio Foggia 1920 players
Serie B players
Serie C players
Serie D players